Raymond Cope Bracken (January 8, 1891 – October 23, 1974) was an American sport shooter who competed in the 1920 Summer Olympics.

He was born in Steubenville, Ohio and died in Columbus, Ohio.

Coached by James H. Snook, and Bracken made his debut by winning the 1917 United States Revolver Association National Championship Pistol Novice Match.  In 1920, along with his coach, he won the gold medal as member of the American team in the team 50 metre free pistol competition, and the silver medal in the individual 30 metre military pistol. He also participated in the individual 50 metre free pistol competition.

References

External links
profile

1891 births
1974 deaths
American male sport shooters
United States Distinguished Marksman
ISSF pistol shooters
Shooters at the 1920 Summer Olympics
Olympic gold medalists for the United States in shooting
Olympic silver medalists for the United States in shooting
Sportspeople from Steubenville, Ohio
Medalists at the 1920 Summer Olympics